Darreh Gol (also known as Darreh Gel) is a village in Zardeyn Rural District, Nir District, Taft County, Yazd Province, Iran. At the 2006 census, its population was 65, in 21 families.

References 

Populated places in Taft County